Anatoli Igorevich Ponomarev (born 12 June 1982) is an Azerbaijani former professional footballer who played as a striker.

Career 
Ponomarev began his career in 1998 with Swedish club Reymersholms IK. He has also played in Sweden for Djurgårdens IF, IK Sirius, Vallentuna BK, Essinge IK, Kalmar FF, GAIS, Östers IF, Degerfors IF and Vasalunds IF, in Spain for RCD Mallorca B, in Greece for Skoda Xanthi, in Azerbaijan for Inter Baku, FK Qarabağ and FK Baku and in Switzerland for FC Vaduz. He last played for Orduspor in Turkey.

While playing in Sweden, Ponomarev was relegated three times in three seasons –  Östers IF (2007), Degerfors IF (2008) and Vasalunds IF (2009).

International career 
Ponomarev has made 16 appearances for the Azerbaijan national football team.

Personal life 
His father is Igor Ponomaryov.

Career statistics

International 
Appearances and goals by national team and year

International goals

References

External links

1982 births
Living people
Azerbaijani footballers
Azerbaijan international footballers
Djurgårdens IF Fotboll players
Essinge IK players
RCD Mallorca B players
Xanthi F.C. players
Kalmar FF players
GAIS players
Östers IF players
Degerfors IF players
FC Vaduz players
Qarabağ FK players
FC Baku players
Shamakhi FK players
Vasalunds IF players
Allsvenskan players
Azerbaijan Premier League players
Super League Greece players
TFF First League players
Azerbaijani expatriate footballers
Expatriate footballers in Liechtenstein
Expatriate footballers in Greece
Expatriate footballers in Turkey
Azerbaijani expatriate sportspeople in Turkey
Azerbaijani expatriate sportspeople in Greece
Expatriate footballers in Sweden
Footballers from Baku
IK Sirius Fotboll players
Association football forwards
Azerbaijani expatriate sportspeople in Liechtenstein
Azerbaijani expatriate sportspeople in Sweden
Azerbaijani expatriate sportspeople in Spain
Expatriate footballers in Spain